Clara Bünger (born 4 July 1986) is a German jurist and politician (The Left) serving as member of the Bundestag since 2022.

Early life and education 
Bünger was born in Oldenburg in 1986 and grew up in Freiberg. She studied Political science at Leipzig University from 2005 until 2012 when she finished her first Staatsexam.

Political career 
In 2021, Bünger was a candidate for the electoral constituency Erzgebirgskreis I but lost to Thomas Dietz. 

In 2022, Bünger moved up into the Bundestag, after Katja Kipping resigned to join the state government of Berlin.

References 

Living people
1986 births
Members of the Bundestag 2021–2025
Members of the Bundestag for The Left
21st-century German women politicians
Leipzig University alumni
Female members of the Bundestag
Members of the Bundestag for Saxony